Al-Noor FC  is a Saudi Arabian football (soccer) team in Sanabes, Qatif City playing at the Saudi Third Division.

Stadium
Prince Nayef bin Abdulaziz StadiumQatif, Saudi Arabia

Current squad 
As of Saudi Third Division:

References

Noor
Football clubs in Eastern Province, Saudi Arabia
1971 establishments in Saudi Arabia
Association football clubs established in 1971